Taxonomic inflation is a pejorative term for what is perceived to be an excessive increase in the number of recognised taxa in a given context, due not to the discovery of new taxa but rather to putatively arbitrary changes to how taxa are delineated.

The best known case is the elevation of a group of subspecies to species rank, through the arbitrary decision that the differences between the various taxa warrant distinguishing them at species rank.

Taxonomic inflation is often claimed to occur for conservation reasons. It may be difficult to make a case for the protection of an isolated and unusual population of a common and widespread species, but it becomes much easier to do so if that population is recognised as a rare subspecies or species.

References

Inflation
Inflation